Lieutenant General Faridoon Noshir 'Billy' Billimoria, PVSM (1933–2005) was an Indian Army officer who  was the 15th General Officer Commanding-in-Chief Central Command. He commanded a battalion in the  Indo-Pakistani War of 1971. He was also the commandant of the Defence Services Staff College in 1986.

Early life and education
Bilimoria attended The Doon School and then joined the 2nd course of the Joint Services Wing (JSW), a forerunner of the National Defence Academy (NDA).

Career
Bilimoria was commissioned into the Indian Army on 7 June 1953 in the 5 Gorkha Rifles (Frontier Force). He graduated from the Defence Services Staff College. He served as aide-de-camp to the first Indian President, Dr Rajendra Prasad between January 1959 to May 1961. He moved to Congo with his battalion as part of the United Nations 
Forces between 1962 and 1963. He took command of 2/5 Gorkha Rifles in October 1969 and saw action during the Indo-Pakistani War of 1971. He was the Indian Army liaison officer with the School of Infantry, Warminster from 1973 for three years. 

After being promoted to a Brigadier, he commanded an infantry brigade in Rajasthan and then was posted as Brigadier General Staff to a corps in the Northern Sector and subsequently as a Deputy General Officer Commanding to an Infantry Division in the Northern Sector. On promotion to Major General, he commanded a Mountain Division in the Eastern Sector and then became the Deputy Commandant and Chief Instructor at the Indian Military Academy. He was promoted to the rank of Lieutenant General and took over as Commandant of the Defence Services Staff College in February 1986. He took over command of 10 Corps in October 1987. 

He took over as Army Commmander of Central Command on 1 November 1989. Bilimoria, while he was the Central Army Commander, was also sent by the Government of India to Sri Lanka in 1990 to review the work of the Indian Peace Keeping Force which had been deployed during the Sri Lankan Civil War under the Indo-Sri Lanka Accord, and it was on his recommendations that the force was recalled in 1990, ending India's military engagement with the LTTE.

Legacy
The Lieutenant General F N Billimoria trophy, named after him, is awarded to the best officer in the graduating class of Army Medical Corps Centre & School in the Lucknow Cantonment.

Personal life
He married his wife Yasmin in January 1960 at Secunderabad. They have two sons. Karan Bilimoria (Baron Bilimoria), the British Indian entrepreneur who founded Cobra Beer is his son.

References

The Doon School alumni
Parsi people
Indian generals
1934 births
2005 deaths
Recipients of the Param Vishisht Seva Medal
Commandants of Defence Services Staff College